Toxorhynchites (Toxorhynchites) splendens is a species of non-hematophagous (not blood-feeding) mosquito belonging to the genus Toxorhynchites. It is widely used as a predator to control dengue mosquitoes.

Distribution
It shows nearly a cosmopolitan distribution throughout the Old World, except African continent both through human influences and natural methods. It is found in India, Sri Lanka Malaysia, Thailand, New Guinea, Fiji Islands, Philippines, Rotuma Island.

Importance
The large expansion is may be due to naval transport of larva from one place to another. In 1934, these mosquitoes were introduced to Fiji as a method of biological control of Aedes polynesiensis, and in India and Malaysia to control Aedes aegypti and Aedes albopictus who are prominent vectors of many human diseases. They prefer to consume eggs and larva Aedes aegypti and Anopheles stephensi.

Alphamethrin, deltamethrin, Malathion can be used to control the mosquito.

References

External links
Laboratory evaluation of Toxorhynchites splendens (Diptera: Culicidae) for predation of Aedes albopictus mosquito larvae.
OBSERVATIONS ON TOXORHYNCHITES SPLENDENS
The use of Toxorhynchites splendens for identification and quantitation of serotypes contained in the tetravalent live attenuated dengue vaccine
Frequency-dependent prey selection by larvae of Toxorhynchites splendens (Diptera: Culicidae)

splendens
Insects described in 1819